Aradas is a civil parish in Aveiro Municipality, Aveiro District, Portugal. The population in 2011 was 9,157, in an area of 8.93 km2.

References

Freguesias of Aveiro, Portugal